Pronk is a Dutch surname, which means "flamboyance" in modern Dutch or "sullen" in Middle Dutch. It may refer to:

Travis Hafner (born 1977), American baseball player, who is nicknamed "Pronk"
Anton Pronk (1941-2016), Dutch footballer
Bert Pronk (1950–2005), Dutch cyclist
Cornelis Pronk (1691–1759), Dutch artist
Jan Pronk (born 1940), Dutch politician 
Jan Pronk (cyclist) (1918-2016), Dutch cyclist
Jos Pronk (born 1983), Dutch cyclist
Judith Pronk (born 1973), Dutch musician
Matthé Pronk (born 1974), Dutch cyclist
Mattheus Pronk (1947–2001), Dutch cyclist
Monique Pronk (born 1958), Dutch rower
Rob Pronk (1928–2012), Dutch musician
Rubinald Pronk (born 1979), Dutch ballet dancer
Ryan Pronk (born 1986), American checkers player
Tijmen Pronk (born 1979), Dutch linguist

Other uses
Pronk, a portmanteau of progressive punk (another name for post-punk)
Pronking, animal behavior involving leaping straight up during pursuit by a predator

References

Dutch-language surnames